Johann Ulrich von Cramer (8 November 1706 – 18 June 1772) was an eminent German judge, legal scholar, and Enlightenment philosopher.

Biography
Cramer was the most important representative of Wolffianism in the area of law; he was first a university professor at the University of Marburg and then one of the highest judges of the Holy Roman Empire, both in Vienna and Wetzlar.

Works

JCramer, Johann Ulrich von. Opuscula, 5 vols., Wolfgang Drechsler (ed.). Christian Wolff, Gesammelte Werke, IIIrd series, vol. 34, pts. 1–5, Hildesheim - Zürich - New York: Olms, 1996.
Cramer, Johann Ulrich von. Sammlung juristischer Ausführungen einiger vertheidigten Rechts-Sachen, welche bey denen höchsten Reichs-Gerichtern durch den Druck bekandt gemacht worden. - Wetzlar, 1759. digital

References

Further reading

External links

Ulrich von Cramer (1706-1772), BnF

1706 births
1772 deaths
German philosophers
German male writers